Sawtooth Peak is a  mountain summit located in Wallowa County, Oregon, US.

Description

Sawtooth Peak is located seven miles west-southwest of Joseph, Oregon, in the Wallowa Mountains. It is set within the Eagle Cap Wilderness on land managed by Wallowa–Whitman National Forest. The peak is situated one mile north of Legore Lake and line parent Twin Peaks. Precipitation runoff from the mountain drains into tributaries of the Lostine River and Wallowa River. The summit is composed of Columbia River basalt which overlays Mesozoic granite of the Wallowa Batholith. This landform's toponym has been officially adopted by the United States Board on Geographic Names.

Climate

Based on the Köppen climate classification, Sawtooth Peak is located in a subarctic climate zone characterized by long, usually very cold winters, and mild summers. Winter temperatures can drop below −10 °F with wind chill factors below −20 °F. Most precipitation in the area is caused by orographic lift.

See also
 List of mountain peaks of Oregon

References

External links

 Weather forecast: Sawtooth Peak

Mountains of Oregon
Mountains of Wallowa County, Oregon
North American 2000 m summits
Wallowa–Whitman National Forest